Luis Mendoza may refer to:

 Luis Mendoza (footballer, born 1945), Venezuelan footballer
 Luis Alfonso Mendoza (1964–2020), Mexican voice actor, voice director and announcer
 Luis Mendoza (boxer) (born 1965), Colombian boxer
 Luis Carlos Mendoza (born 1970), Venezuelan footballer
 Luis Antonio Mendoza (born 1973), Mexican football manager and player
 Luis Mendoza (baseball) (born 1983), Mexican pitcher
 Luis Mendoza (born 1983), Panamanian footballer
 Luis Ángel Mendoza (born 1990), Mexican footballer
 Luis Ernesto Mendoza Cerrato (?–2011), owner of the Channel 24 broadcast facilities in Danli, Honduras